Acroaspis decorosa is a species of orbweaver spider that is endemic to New Zealand.

Taxonomy 
Acroaspis decorsa was first described in 1894 as Epeira decorosa by Arthur Urquhart. This species was later moved to the Eriophora genus by Ray Forster in 1988. The species was moved again in 2010 to the Acroaspis genus.

References 

Araneidae
Spiders described in 1894
Spiders of New Zealand
Endemic fauna of New Zealand
Endemic spiders of New Zealand